Scott Gordon Perry (born May 27, 1962) is an American politician and retired U.S. Army National Guard Brigadier General. His district, numbered the 4th district from 2013 to 2019, includes Harrisburg, York, and most of the inner suburbs. Perry serves on the House Transportation, Infrastructure, and Foreign Affairs Committees.

A member of the Republican Party, Perry represented the 92nd district in the Pennsylvania House of Representatives from 2006 to 2012, and served on the Committees on Appropriations, Consumer Affairs, Labor Relations, Veterans Affairs, Emergency Preparedness, and Rules. He is a retired Pennsylvania Army National Guard Brigadier General. In November 2021, Perry was elected chairman of the House Freedom Caucus, the most conservative House Republican group.  He is also a member of the Congressional Veterans Caucus and the Second Amendment Caucus.

On December 20, 2021, the House committee investigating the January 6 Capitol attack called for an interview with Perry, the first time it publicly sought to question a sitting member of Congress. Perry declined the request the next day. The panel's chairperson said it had evidence from several witnesses that Perry had "an important role" in efforts to install Assistant Attorney General Jeffrey Clark as acting attorney general as part of attempts to overturn the 2020 United States presidential election. According to the committee, Perry introduced President Donald Trump to environmental lawyer Jeffrey Clark. The committee subpoenaed Perry on May 12, 2022, and Perry declined to participate, citing legal authority.  After the November 2022 elections, the committee referred Perry to the House Ethics Panel for refusing their subpoena; it is unclear whether the panel will support any action.

Early life, education and family
Perry is the grandson of Colombian immigrants and was born in San Diego, California. He was raised by a single mom who fled abuse and worked several jobs to survive and support her children, with whom she finally landed in Central Pennsylvania in their first home in Harrisburg, then to Dillsburg, Pennsylvania, when he was seven. 

Perry and his family were on public assistance for several years during his youth.  He was raised in a spartan home that initially had no electricity and plumbing, pumping water from a well and cutting firewood with his older brother in the winter.

In 1980, Perry graduated from Northern High School in Dillsburg and Cumberland-Perry Vo-Tech School in Cumberland County, Pennsylvania. He put himself through college while working full-time, earned his associate's degree from Harrisburg Area Community College, and graduated from Pennsylvania State University with a B.S. in business administration and management in 1991.  In July 2012, he received a Master's degree in strategic planning from the United States Army War College.

Perry began working at age 13, picking fruit at Ashcombe’s Farm in Mechanicsburg. Since then, he has worked as a mechanic, dock worker, draftsman and a licensed insurance agent, among other jobs.

Perry has been married to Christy Perry for more than 20 years; they have two children.

Military service

Army National Guard
Perry began his military career in 1980 when he enlisted in the Pennsylvania Army National Guard. He attended basic training at Fort Dix, New Jersey, and graduated from Advanced Individual Training at Fort Belvoir, Virginia, as a technical drafting specialist. He graduated from Pennsylvania's Officer Candidate School and was commissioned a Second Lieutenant in the Field Artillery.

After receiving his commission, Perry qualified as a helicopter pilot in the United States Army Aviation Branch, where he earned qualifications in numerous aircraft (Huey, Cayuse, Kiowa, Cobra, Chinook, Apache, and Blackhawk) and an Instructor Pilot rating. He commanded military units at the company, battalion and brigade levels and served in a variety of staff assignments as he advanced through the ranks, including executive officer of 1st Squadron, 104th Cavalry Regiment during deployment to Bosnia and Herzegovina in 2002–03, and Commander of 2nd Battalion (General Support), 104th Aviation Regiment beginning in 2008.

Iraq war
In 2009–2010, Perry commanded 2nd Battalion, 104th Aviation Regiment during its pre-deployment training and service in Iraq for Operation Iraqi Freedom. As Task Force Diablo, 2-104th Aviation was credited with flying 1,400 missions, accruing over 13,000 combat flight hours, and transporting over 3 million pounds of cargo and 43,000 soldiers and civilians. Perry flew 44 combat missions and accrued nearly 200 combat flight hours.

Post-Iraq

After returning from Iraq, Perry was promoted to Colonel and assigned to command the Pennsylvania National Guard's 166th Regiment (Regional Training Institute). From 2012 to 2014, he commanded the garrison at the Fort Indiantown Gap National Training Center. In May 2014, Perry was assigned as Assistant Division Commander of the 28th Infantry Division and promoted to Brigadier General in November 2015. In May 2016, he was selected as Assistant Adjutant General at the Pennsylvania National Guard's Joint Force Headquarters. Perry retired from the Pennsylvania National Guard on March 1, 2019.

Business career
After graduating from college, Perry co-founded Hydrotech Mechanical Services, Inc. with his mother in 1993. He was listed as the company's secretary and treasurer. Hydrotech is a mechanical contracting firm in Dillsburg that provides contract construction and maintenance services to municipal and investor-owned utilities from North Carolina to New York, specializing in large meter calibration. In 2002, the Pennsylvania Department of Environmental Protection accused Hydrotech of altering sewage monitoring reports while doing work for the Memphord Estates Sewage Treatment Company (MESCO). Perry claimed that after taking a Department of Environmental Protection course on how to properly run a sewage plant, they realized that the work they had been doing at the plant was wrong and notified the Pennsylvania Department of Environmental Protection, triggering the investigation. He faced criminal charges of conspiring to falsify state-mandated sewage records. In the aftermath of the investigation and review of the evidence, he was allowed to complete a diversion program and avoid criminal charges, which allowed him to maintain his U.S security clearance. Perry maintained his innocence and the state expunged his record.

Government service
Before entering politics, Perry chaired the Carroll Township Planning Commission, and was a member of the Township Source Water Protection Committee. He chaired the Dillsburg Area Wellhead Protection Advisory Committee and served on the Dillsburg Revitalization Committee. He remains a member of the Jaycees and held the office of regional director for the state organization. He is a member of Dillsburg America Legion Post #26, Dillsburg Veterans of Foreign Wars VFW Post #6771, and Lions Club International.

Pennsylvania House of Representatives

Elections
In 2006, state representative Bruce Smith of Pennsylvania's 92nd House district decided to retire. Perry won the Republican primary with 41% of the vote. He won the general election with 71% of the vote, and took office on January 2, 2007. In 2008, Perry was reelected to a second term unopposed. In 2010, he was reelected to a third term unopposed.

Committee assignments

U.S. House of Representatives

Elections

2012

In 2012, Perry gave up his state house seat to run for the 4th congressional district. The district had previously been the 19th district, represented by six-term incumbent Republican Todd Platts, who was giving up the seat to honor a self-imposed term limit. In 2010, when Platts wanted to become U.S. Comptroller General, he spoke to Perry about running for the seat.

Perry won a seven-way primary with over 50% of the vote. Although outspent nearly 2 to 1 in the campaign, he beat his closest competitor with nearly three times as many votes. Political newcomer Harry Perkinson, an engineer, advanced in a two-way Democratic primary. Perry won the general election, 60%–34%.

2014

In 2014, Perry was unopposed in the Republican primary and the former Harrisburg mayor, Linda D. Thompson, was unopposed in the Democratic primary. Perry won the general election, 75%–25%.

2016

Perry won the 2016 election with no primary challenge and no official Democratic opponent. Joshua Burkholder of Harrisburg, a political novice, withdrew from the Democratic primary after too many signatures on his qualifying petition were successfully challenged. His subsequent write-in candidacy won the Democratic primary, but he was unaffiliated in the general election. Perry defeated Burkholder, 66%–34%.

2018

After ruling the state's congressional map an unconstitutional gerrymander, the Pennsylvania Supreme Court issued a new map for the 2018 elections. Perry's district was renumbered the 10th and made significantly more compact than its predecessor. It lost most of the more rural and Republican areas of York County to the neighboring 11th district (the old 16th). To make up for the loss in population, it was pushed slightly to the north, absorbing the remainder of Democratic-leaning Dauphin County that had not been in the old 4th. On paper, the new district was less Republican than its predecessor. Had the district existed in 2016, Donald Trump would have won it with 52% of the vote to Hillary Clinton's 43%; Trump carried the old 4th with 58% of the vote.

Pastor and Army veteran George Scott won the Democratic primary by a narrow margin and opposed Perry in the general election for the reconfigured 10th. The two debated in October before Perry won with 51.3% of the vote to Scott's 48.7%, with the new district boundaries taking effect in 2019. Perry held on by winning the district's share of his home county, York County, by 11,600 votes. This was the district's closest race since 1974, when Bill Goodling won his first term in what was then the 19th with 51% of the vote.

2020

In 2020, Perry had no Republican primary challenge, and the Pennsylvania auditor general, Eugene DePasquale, won a two-way Democratic primary. Perry was reelected with 53.3% of the vote in the general election.

2022

In 2022, Perry defeated Democratic nominee Shamaine Daniels with 54% of the vote.

Tenure
Perry is a member of the Freedom Caucus. In November 2021, he was elected to chair the group, succeeding Andy Biggs in January 2022.

In October 2017, in the aftermath of Hurricane Maria, Perry accused CNN anchor Chris Cuomo of exaggerating the crisis in Puerto Rico.

In January 2018, Perry suggested that ISIS might have been involved in the 2017 Las Vegas shooting. ISIS claimed responsibility for the attack, but authorities have maintained that gunman Stephen Paddock acted alone.

In December 2019, Perry was one of 195 Republicans to vote against both articles of impeachment against President Trump.

In October 2020, Perry was one of 17 Republicans to vote against a House resolution to formally condemn the QAnon conspiracy theory. He said he voted against the resolution because he was concerned about infringements on free speech, saying, "it's very dangerous for the government ... to determine what is okay to like and what is not okay to like."

In March 2021, Perry voted against the American Rescue Plan Act of 2021. He said only 9% of the act's spending was allotted to defeat the COVID-19 virus, while the rest would advance Democratic policies.

In April 2021, at a House Foreign Affairs subcommittee meeting on immigration, days after Fox News host Tucker Carlson promoted the Great Replacement theory, Perry said, "For many Americans, what seems to be happening or what they believe right now is happening is, what appears to them is we're replacing national-born American—native-born Americans to permanently transform the political landscape of this very nation."

In June 2021, Perry was one of 21 House Republicans to vote against a resolution to give the Congressional Gold Medal to police officers who defended the U.S. Capitol on January 6. He cosponsored a bill, introduced the same day, that would give the same medal to police officers without mentioning the attack.

At the June 2021 Republican Pennsylvania Leadership Conference, Perry said Democrats "are not the loyal opposition. They are the opposition to everything you love and believe in" and "want to destroy the country you grew up in", invoking comparisons to Nazis.

In July 2022, Perry was among 47 House Republicans to vote for the Respect for Marriage Act, which would repeal the Defense of Marriage Act and protect the right to same-sex marriage at a federal level. Perry said, "Agree or disagree with same-sex marriage, my vote affirmed my long-held belief that Americans who enter into legal agreements deserve to live their lives without the threat that our federal government will dissolve what they've built." Four months later, in an interview with Tony Perkins of the Family Research Council, Perry said he was tricked because he did not want to appear racist by voting against the bill, which also protects interracial marriage. Perry voted against final passage on December 8, 2022.

Foreign policy
In 2020, Perry voted against the National Defense Authorization Act of 2021, which in part would prevent the president from withdrawing soldiers from Afghanistan without congressional approval.

In March 2021, Perry was one of 14 House Republicans to vote against a measure condemning the Myanmar coup d'état that overwhelmingly passed.

In July 2021, Perry voted against the bipartisan ALLIES Act, which would increase by 8,000 the number of special immigrant visas for Afghan allies of the U.S. military during its invasion of Afghanistan while also reducing some application requirements that caused long application backlogs; the bill passed in the House 407–16.

In April 2022, Perry voted against a bill to encourage documentation and preservation of Russian war crimes during its invasion of Ukraine.

In 2023, Perry was among 47 Republicans to vote in favor of H.Con.Res. 21, which directed President Joe Biden to remove U.S. troops from Syria within 180 days.

Immigration
Perry voted against the Further Consolidated Appropriations Act of 2020 which authorized DHS to nearly double the available H-2B visas for the remainder of FY 2020.

Perry voted against the Consolidated Appropriations Act (H.R. 1158), which effectively prohibits ICE from cooperating with Health and Human Services to detain or remove illegal alien sponsors of unaccompanied alien children (UACs).

Involvement in attempts to overturn the 2020 presidential election
According to The Philadelphia Inquirer, Perry was "one of the leading figures in the effort to throw out Pennsylvania’s votes in the 2020 presidential election."

After the election, Perry promoted false claims of election fraud. Days after the election, in text messages to White House Chief of Staff Mark Meadows, Perry suggested John Ratcliffe should direct the National Security Agency to investigate alleged Chinese hacking. Perry also asserted "the Brits" were behind a conspiracy to manipulate voting machines and that CIA director Gina Haspel was covering it up. The next month, he sent Meadows a link to a YouTube video that asserted voting machines had been manipulated via satellite from Italy; Meadows later sent the video to former Acting Attorney General Richard Donoghue, seeking an investigation. Donoghue told the committee the contentions in the video, originating from QAnon and far-right platforms which had been brought to the White House, were "pure insanity."

Perry was one of 126 Republican House members to sign an amicus brief in support of Texas v. Pennsylvania, a lawsuit filed at the United States Supreme Court contesting the results of the 2020 presidential election, in which Joe Biden defeated Trump.

Perry reportedly played a key role in a December 2020 crisis at the Justice Department, in which Trump considered firing Jeffrey A. Rosen and replacing him with Jeffrey Clark, the acting chief of the Civil Division of the DOJ. According to The Los Angeles Times, Perry "prompted" Trump to consider the replacement. The New York Times reported that Perry introduced Clark to Trump because Clark's "openness to conspiracy theories about election fraud presented Mr. Trump with a welcome change from Rosen, who stood by the results of the election and had repeatedly resisted the president's efforts to undo them." Before the certification of the electoral college vote on January 6, Perry and Clark reportedly discussed a plan in which the Justice Department would send Georgia legislators a letter suggesting the DOJ had evidence of voter fraud and suggesting the legislators invalidate Georgia's electoral votes, even though the DOJ had investigated reports of fraud but found nothing significant, as attorney general Bill Barr had publicly announced weeks earlier. Clark drafted a letter to Georgia officials and presented it to Rosen and his deputy Richard Donoghue. It claimed the DOJ had "identified significant concerns that may have impacted the outcome of the election in multiple States" and urged the Georgia legislature to convene a special session for the "purpose of considering issues pertaining to the appointment of Presidential Electors." Rosen and Donoghue rejected the proposal. In August 2021, CNN reported that Ratcliffe had briefed top Justice Department officials that no evidence had been found of any foreign powers' interference with voting machines. Clark was reportedly concerned that intelligence community analysts were withholding information and believed Perry and others knew more about possible foreign interference. Clark requested authorization from Rosen and Donoghue for another briefing from Ratcliffe, asserting hackers had found that "a Dominion machine accessed the Internet through a smart thermostat with a net connection trail leading back to China."

On January 6, 2021, Perry joined Missouri senator Josh Hawley in objecting to counting Pennsylvania's electoral votes in the 2020 presidential election. During the storming of the U.S. Capitol that day, Perry and his congressional colleagues were ushered to a secure location.

On December 20, 2021, House Select Committee on the January 6 Attack chairman Bennie Thompson wrote to Perry asking him to provide information about his involvement in the effort to install Clark as acting attorney general. Thompson believed Perry had been involved in the effort to install Clark, given previous testimony from Rosen and Donoghue, as well as communications between Perry and Meadows. Perry declined the request the next day, asserting the committee was illegitimate. Among several text messages to Meadows the committee released on December 14 was one attributed to a "member of Congress" dated January 5 that read "Please check your signal", a reference to the encrypted messaging system Signal. In his letter to Perry, Thompson mentioned evidence that Perry had communicated with Meadows using Signal, though Perry denied sending that particular text message. CNN acquired and published additional Meadows text messages in April 2022 that confirmed Perry had sent that message.

On June 9, 2022, Select Committee member Liz Cheney asserted that Perry requested a presidential pardon from Trump in the weeks after the January 6 attack. Perry denied Cheney's assertion, calling it "an absolute, shameless, and soulless lie". On June 23, 2022, the Select Committee broadcast testimony from Cassidy Hutchinson, a former aide to Meadows, who said Perry was one of several lawmakers who contacted her to "inquire about preemptive pardons." In response, Perry said he had never spoken with any White House staff about a pardon for him or any other members of Congress.

In August 2022, Perry reported that three FBI agents had seized his cellphone after presenting him with a warrant. He called the seizure an "unnecessary and aggressive action". Perry asked Chief Judge of the D.C. District Court Beryl Howell to prevent investigators from accessing 2,219 documents stored on his phone, citing the Speech or Debate Clause of the U.S. Constitution. On February 24, 2023 Howell unsealed her December 2022 ruling that found Perry had an "astonishing view" of his immunity, ordering him to disclose 2,055 of the documents, including all 960 of his contacts with members of the executive branch. The ruling was subject to appeal to the D.C. Circuit Court of Appeals and perhaps the Supreme Court.

Committee assignments 
 Committee on Foreign Affairs
 Subcommittee on Asia, the Pacific and Nonproliferation
 Subcommittee on Oversight and Investigations
 Committee on Transportation and Infrastructure
 Subcommittee on Aviation
 Subcommittee on Railroads, Pipelines, and Hazardous Materials

Caucus memberships
 Freedom Caucus
Second Amendment Caucus

See also
 List of Hispanic and Latino Americans in the United States Congress

References

External links

 Congressman Scott Perry official U.S. House website
 Scott Perry for Congress
 
 
 

|-

|-

|-

|-

1962 births
Living people
Politicians from San Diego
Politicians from Harrisburg, Pennsylvania
People from Cumberland County, Pennsylvania
People from York County, Pennsylvania
Military personnel from California
Military personnel from Pennsylvania
American Master Army Aviators
National Guard (United States) generals
Pennsylvania National Guard personnel
United States Army generals
Republican Party members of the United States House of Representatives from Pennsylvania
Republican Party members of the Pennsylvania House of Representatives
2020 United States presidential election
Controversies of the 2020 United States presidential election
Recipients of the Meritorious Service Medal (United States)
Smeal College of Business alumni
United States Army War College alumni
20th-century American military personnel
21st-century American politicians